The Canadian University Society for Intercollegiate Debate (CUSID generally) is the national organization which governs all English language competitive university debating and public speaking in Canada. It sanctions several official annual tournaments and represents Canadian debating domestically and abroad. Its membership consists of student debating unions, sanctioned by their respective universities, from across Canada. CUSID has been described as "a student-run, parliamentary debate league with close ties to the American Parliamentary Debate Association".

Many prominent Canadians were university debaters, including Prime Ministers Justin Trudeau, Joe Clark and Brian Mulroney, MP John Godfrey, Canadian Supreme Court justices Ian Binnie and Morris Fish, songwriter Leonard Cohen, entrepreneur Moses Znaimer, environmentalist David Suzuki, and journalist Ian Hanomansing. CUSID debaters have gone on to notable careers in law, business, government and academia and the presidency of the organization is a highly sought-after position.

History 
CUSID was officially founded in 1978, although it held its first annual tournament in 1977.  The regular tournaments held under its auspices, such as those at the University of Toronto, McGill University, the University of Western Ontario, Queen's University, and the University of Ottawa predate CUSID's formation by many decades.

Founded as a national organization with strong central Canadian region roots, over the years, individual regional differences—particularly the separate identities of "CUSID East" and "CUSID West"—have become more pronounced. One of its primary functions is facilitating communications between its members institutions. Until the late 2000s, those communications have been primarily through their online forum, CUSIDnet, first set up in 1994, as the first online student debating forum in the world. More recently, communications are conducted through social media platforms such as Facebook.

Annual intervarsity tournaments held in Canada include the McGill University Winter Carnival, the Queen's University Chancellor's Cup and Sutherland IV, the Carleton University Lord Dorchester Cup, the University of Toronto Hart House IV, the University of Ottawa Father Guindon Cup, and the Wilfrid Laurier University/University of Waterloo Seagram Cup.

The inaugural British Parliamentary National Championship was hosted in 2004 at the University of Toronto. Unlike other CUSID title tournaments, participants do not need to be a member of a CUSID institution in order to take part. This leads to the tournament to often be attended by American and other international teams.

In 2020, for the first time in history, the society was forced to cancel its Canadian Parliamentary National Debating Championship due to the risk presented by COVID-19. Other tournaments affected included Carleton's Lord Dorchester Cup, the North American Womxn and Gender Minorities Debating Championship and numerous American tournaments. In July 2020, the National Championship was revived by hosting an online iteration organized by the year's original host institution, the University of Calgary Debate Society. Due to continued pandemic restrictions, the entirety of the 2020–2021 season was also held online.

In 2020 CUSID voted to end the long-standing tradition to not allow hybrid teams (teams representing two different institutions) at Canadian Parliamentary Nationals, the Central Canadian Debating Championship, the Atlantic Canadian Debating Championship and the Western Canadian Debating Championship. This aligned them with the society's British Parliamentary Championship, which has always allowed such teams.

Organization 
CUSID is subdivided into three regional bodies, representing each region of Canada:
 CUSID Central, for Ontario and Quebec, which sponsors the Central Canadian Debating Championship (Léger Cup)
 CUSID Atlantic, for the Atlantic Provinces, which sponsors the Atlantic Canadian Debating Championship
 CUSID West, for the Western Provinces, Territories, and the U.S. state of Alaska, which sponsors the Western Canadian Debating Championship (McGoun Cup)

CUSID nationally and internationally sanctions several official championship tournaments, including:
 Canadian Parliamentary National Debating Championship
 British Parliamentary Debating Championship (typically called BP Champs)
 Central Canadian Debating Championship (the Léger Cup)
 Western Canadian Debating Championship (the McGoun Cup)
 Atlantic Canadian Debating Championship
 North American Debating Championship (with the American Parliamentary Debate Association)
 North American University Debating Championship
 World Universities Debating Championship (with other national debate organizations)

The president of CUSID is the head of the organization and leads an elected executive team of six national and regional officers. They also represents CUSID and Canadian debating interests inside and outside of Canada, and is the Canadian representative on the World Universities Debating Council. They are elected annually by the member institutions at the National Championships.

There have been six CUSID Presidents who won the National Championships during their term as President: Jason Brent (1992), Gerald Butts (1993), Robert Silver (2000), Vinay Mysore (2010), Louis Tsilivis (2013), and Harar Hall (2019).

Notable Presidents of CUSID 
 Matthew Mendelsohn (1986–1988)
 Todd Swift (1988–1989)
 Gerald Butts (1992–1993)
 Shuman Ghosemajumder (1994–1995)

Formats 

Many CUSID tournaments are held in the Canadian Parliamentary Style of debate. This style emphasizes argumentation and rhetoric, rather than research and detailed factual knowledge. Each round consists of two teams – the government team and the opposition team – each of which consists of two debaters. Teams alternate between government and opposition at tournaments. The speaking times in CUSID Central and East are:

 Prime Minister (Constructive): 7 minutes
 Member of Opposition: 7 minutes
 Minister of the Crown: 7 minutes
 Leader of Opposition: 10 minutes
 Prime Minister (Rebuttal): 3 minutes

A new modification to the above times was introduced at the 2003 McGill University Winter Carnival Invitational called the Prime Minister's Rebuttal Extension (PMRE). The PMRE allows the government team the option to take a 6-minute PMC and 4-minute PMR and was designed to help compensate for the alleged inherent advantage to the opposition side. In most rounds, the resolution is "squirrelable", meaning that the government team can propose any topic it wants for debate. The Prime Minister Constructive (PMC) lays out the topic for debate and presents arguments in favor of its position. The opposition team must then immediately present opposing arguments. New arguments can be presented in the first four speeches; they are prohibited in the rebuttal speeches. In the early 2010s the "opposition choice" option was introduced. Rather than presenting the motion as it stands, the Prime Minister lays out the topic and the opposite bench has the option of choosing which  side of the motion they would prefer.

"Points of Information" are generally permitted and expected in the standard Canadian Parliamentary style. With POIs, debaters may rise and attempt to ask a question of an opposing debater, who can choose whether to accept or refuse the question. It is generally considered good form to accept at least a few questions during a speech.

Tournaments are otherwise held in British Parliamentary, sometimes known as WUDC style. Presently, all tournaments for the first semester of the academic year, September–December, use British Parliamentary as the format. This is for teams to prepare for the World University Debating Championship which occurs over New Year's each year. Since its introduction, British Parliamentary has become the more competitive of the two formats, largely because it is the format used for international competition.

Canadian Parliamentary National Championships 

National Debating Championship By Institution

British Parliamentary National Championships

Related 
 : Cambridge Union Society
 : Oxford Union Society
 : The Durham Union Society
 : London School of Economics, Grimshaw International Relations Club
 :Yale Debate Association
 :Berkeley Forum
 :Studentenforum im Tönissteiner Kreis
 :Olivaint Conference of Belgium

References

External links 
 
 CUSID Central Debating Guide

Student debating societies
Universities and colleges in Canada